Turkey Time is a 1933 British comedy film directed by Tom Walls and starring Walls, Ralph Lynn, Robertson Hare and Dorothy Hyson. The screenplay concerns a group of guests come to stay with the Stoatt family in the seaside town of Eden Bay for Christmas. They soon become involved with an impoverished concert performer whose innocent presence in the house leads to a series of misunderstandings. It was adapted from the 1931 play Turkey Time by Ben Travers, one of the Aldwych Farces.

Production
The film was part of a successful series of screen adaptations of the Aldwych Farces throughout the 1930s that had begun with Rookery Nook in 1930. It was made by British Gaumont, the second film the actors had made with that studio after switching from Herbert Wilcox's British & Dominions Film Corporation. The screenplay was written by Ben Travers, adapted from his own play. The German Alfred Junge worked as art director.

Cast
 Tom Walls as Max Wheeler
 Ralph Lynn as David Winterton
 Dorothy Hyson as Rose Adair
 Robertson Hare as Edwin Stoatt
 Mary Brough as Mrs. Gather
 Norma Varden as Ernestine Stoatt
 Veronica Rose as Louise Stoatt
 D. A. Clarke-Smith as Westbourne
 Marjorie Corbett as Florence, the maid
 Daphne Scorer as Jane
 Gwen Clifford as Cook
 O. B. Clarence as Shopowner

References

External links

1933 films
British comedy films
1933 comedy films
Films directed by Tom Walls
British films based on plays
Films set in England
Aldwych farce
Gainsborough Pictures films
Films shot at Lime Grove Studios
Films scored by Jack Beaver
British black-and-white films
1930s English-language films
1930s British films